A ghost cell is an enlarged eosinophilic epithelial cell with eosinophilic cytoplasm but without a nucleus.

The ghost cells indicate coagulative necrosis where there is cell death but retainment of cellular architecture. In histologic sections ghost cells are those which appear as shadow cells. They are dead cells. For example, in peripheral blood smear preparations, the RBCs are lysed and appear as ghost cells.

They are found in:
 Craniopharyngioma (Rathke pouch)
 Odontoma
 Ameloblastic fibroma
 Calcifying odontogenic cyst (Gorlin cyst)
 Pilomatricoma

References 

Histology